Edgeworthia gardneri (common names: Indian papertree, Nepalese paperbush;) is a plant in the Thymelaeaceae family. It can be distinguished by its brownish red stem. The flowers are hermaphrodite (they have both male and female organs).

Range and habitat
Edgeworthia gardneri is native to the Himalayan regions of Bhutan; northern Burma; China (in eastern Xizang and northwestern Yunnan provinces); India; and Nepal.

It is cultivated elsewhere.

Uses

Edgeworthia gardneri is planted as an ornamental; and a high quality paper is made from its bark fibres. This species is said to be the best of the various species that are used to make hand-made paper in the Himalayas.

References

External links
 An early illustration of E. gardneri, from plantillustrations.org

Thymelaeoideae
Plants described in 1820
Flora of the Indian subcontinent
Flora of Myanmar
Flora of China